Donald Macrivayr, a priest of the Diocese of Clogher,  was appointed Dean of Armagh in 1492 At some point the previous incumbent Peter O'Mulmoy was restored.

References

Deans of Armagh
15th-century Irish Roman Catholic priests